Khazov is a Russian masculine surname, its feminine counterpart is Khazova. Notable people with the surname include:

Anton Khazov (born 1979), Russian football player
Irina Khazova (born 1984), Russian cross-country skier

Russian-language surnames